Nurshahidah Roslie is the first professional female boxer from Singapore. She won the Asian featherweight championship belt of World Boxing Council in 2017 and was one of the finalists of the WBO  Asia-Pacific super bantamweight title. Nicknamed "The Sniper", she was awarded with Asia's Female Champion of the Year for 2017 from World Boxing Council and was the highest- ranking female featherweight boxer from Asia, as of May 2018. She had once featured in the amateur boxing squad of Singapore.

References 

Year of birth missing (living people)
Living people
Singaporean boxers
Super-bantamweight boxers